Grant Karlus Mizens, OAM (born 19 April 1977) is an Australian wheelchair basketball player. He was born in Sydney, New South Wales.

Basketball

He is classified as a 2.0 player and plays guard.

National team

Paralympics

He was part of the Australia men's national wheelchair basketball team that won a silver medal at the 2004 Summer Paralympics,  and also part of the team that won a gold medal at the 2008 Summer Paralympics, for which he received a Medal of the Order of Australia.
At the 2012 Summer Paralympics he was part of the Australian men's wheelchair team that won silver.

Other competitions
He was a member of the national team that competed at the 2009 IWBF Asia Oceania Championships. He was a member of the Australia men's national wheelchair basketball team that competed at the 2010 Wheelchair Basketball World Championship that won a gold medal.

Club basketball
Mizens plays club basketball for the  West Sydney Razorbacks. In 2010, he was playing club basketball with the Wenty League Wheelkings.

References

Paralympic gold medalists for Australia
Paralympic silver medalists for Australia
Wheelchair category Paralympic competitors
Wheelchair basketball players at the 2004 Summer Paralympics
Wheelchair basketball players at the 2008 Summer Paralympics
Wheelchair basketball players at the 2012 Summer Paralympics
Paralympic wheelchair basketball players of Australia
Recipients of the Medal of the Order of Australia
1977 births
Living people
Illinois Fighting Illini Paralympic athletes
Medalists at the 2004 Summer Paralympics
Medalists at the 2008 Summer Paralympics
Medalists at the 2012 Summer Paralympics
Paralympic medalists in wheelchair basketball